Nebielianayou is a department or commune of Sissili Province in southern Burkina Faso. Its capital lies at the town of Nebielianayou.

Towns and villages

References

Departments of Burkina Faso
Sissili Province